Pokhvistnevo is the name of several inhabited localities in Russia.

Urban localities
Pokhvistnevo, Samara Oblast, a town in Samara Oblast; administratively incorporated as a town of oblast significance

Rural localities
, a village in Lomovetsky Selsoviet of Trosnyansky District of Oryol Oblast
, a selo in Studensky Selsoviet of Belinsky District of Penza Oblast